Several ships of the Royal Navy have borne the name HMS Resolution. However, the first English warship to bear the name Resolution was actually the first rate Prince Royal (built in 1610 and rebuilt in 1641), which was renamed Resolution in 1650 following the inauguration of the Commonwealth, and continued to bear that name until 1660, when the name Prince Royal was restored. The name Resolution was bestowed on the first of the vessels listed below:

 , a 50-gun third-rate frigate launched 1654 as Tredagh; renamed Resolution 1660; destroyed after grounding by a Dutch fireship in the St James's Day Battle 4 August 1666.
 , a 70-gun third-rate ship of the line launched 1667; rebuilt 1698; foundered in 1703.
 , a 70-gun third rate launched 1705; run ashore to avoid capture 1707.
 , a 70-gun third rate launched 1708; wrecked 1711.
 , a 74-gun third rate launched 1758; run aground and lost 1759 at the Battle of Quiberon Bay.
 , a 74-gun third rate launched 1770; broken up 1813.
 , the vessel of Captain James Cook in his explorations.
 , a cutter purchased 1779; went missing in the North Sea June 1797, presumed to have foundered.
 , lead ship of the  ballistic missile submarines in service from 1966 to 1994.

Also
Resolution was a gunboat that the garrison at Gibraltar launched in June 1782 during the Great Siege of Gibraltar. She was one of 12. Each was armed with an 18-pounder gun, and received a crew of 21 men drawn from Royal Navy vessels stationed at Gibraltar.  provided Resolutions crew.
 HMS Resolution, a cutter in the West Indies, date of acquisition unknown and date of loss unknown. On 10 November 1800 Captain Peter Halkett of  captured the Spanish sloop of war Resolution in the West Indies. She was armed with 18 guns and had a crew of 149 men, under the command of Don Francisco Darrichena. Halkett reported that she was the former British navy cutter Resolution. Resolution was in such an irreparable state that after a few days Halkett destroyed her.
Resolution, a victualing hoy, of 75 tons, offered for sale on 22 September 1828, lying at Deptford.
 HMS Resolution a fictional ship in the Jack Aubrey series of novels

Battle honours
Ships named Resolution have earned the following battle honours:

Kentish Knock, 1652
Gabbard, 1653
Scheveningen, 1653
Lowestoft, 1665
Four Days' Battle, 1666
Orfordness, 1666
Sole Bay, 1672
Schooneveld, 1673
Texel, 1673
Barfleur, 1692
Quiberon Bay, 1759
St Vincent, 1780
St Kitts, 1782
The Saints, 1782
Basque Roads, 1809
Atlantic, 1939−40
Norway, 1940

See also
 , a survey ship of the Royal New Zealand Navy in service between 1997 and 2012. Named after the 1771-launched Resolution commanded by James Cook.

Citations and references
Citations

References

 
Drinkwater, John (1905) A History of the Siege of Gibraltar, 1779-1783: With a Description and Account of that Garrison from the Earliest Times. (J. Murray).
 

Royal Navy ship names